Howler  may refer to:
Howler (band), a band from Minneapolis, Minnesota
The Howler, a roller coaster at Holiday World in Santa Claus, Indiana
The Howler (video game)
Howler (mascot), the mascot of the Arizona Coyotes
Howler (Animorphs), a fictional alien species from the Animorphs setting
Howler (Harry Potter), a magical object in the Harry Potter setting.
Howlers, a type of mathematical fallacy
Howlers, creatures in Resistance: Fall of Man
Howlers, creatures in Metro 2033

See also
Erbil or Hewlêr, a city in Iraq
Howler monkey, a New World monkey
Off-hook tone or howler tone